The Franklin O-335 (company designations variations on 6A and 6V) was an American air-cooled aircraft engine of the 1940s. The engine was of six-cylinder, horizontally-opposed layout and displaced .

Design and development
These engines were commonly vertically mounted and used to power many early helicopters in the United States. They were closely related to the 2A4 and 4A4 2- and 4-cylinder engines. In various subtypes, the 6A4 remained in continuous production from 1945 to the time Franklin's United States operations ceased in 1975, with versions continuing in Polish production into the 1990s.

In 1947 this engine was modified into a water-cooled version by the Tucker Car Corporation for use in the 1948 Tucker Sedan.  Tucker liked the engine so much that he purchased the Aircooled Motors/Franklin Engine Company, and it remained under the ownership of the Tucker family until 1961.

Variants

O-335-1Military designation of vertical installation model for helicopters :
O-335-3Similar to -1 but changes in starter installation
O-335-5
O-335-5B
6A-335 at 2,800 rpm
6AL-335 at 2,600 rpm
6A4-125 at 2,200 rpm
6A4-130 at 2,200 rpm
6A4-135 at 2,450 rpm
6A4-140 at 2,375 rpm
6A4-145 at 2,600 rpm
6A4-150 at 2,600 rpm
6A4-165 at 2,800 rpm
6A4-200 at 3,100 rpm
6AG-335 at 3,400 rpm
6AG4-185 at 3,100  rpm
6AGS-335 at 3,400 rpm
6AS-335 at 3,200 rpm
6V-335-B at 3,100 rpm
6V-335-A1A at 3,100 rpm
6V-335-A1B at 3,100 rpm
6V4-165
6V4-178-B32 at 3,000 rpm
6V4-200-C32 at 3,100 rpm
6VS-O-335 at 3,200 rpm

Applications

Specifications (6AL-335 / 6A4-150-B3)

See also

Notes

References

 Gunston, Bill. (1986) World Encyclopedia of Aero Engines. Patrick Stephens: Wellingborough. p. 57
 Erickson, Jack. Horizontally Opposed Piston Aero Engines

 US Department of Transportation Federal Aviation Administration Type Certificate Data Sheet E-238 Revision 12, December 8, 1994.

Boxer engines
1940s aircraft piston engines
Franklin aircraft engines